Mammari is a village located in the Nicosia District of Cyprus north of Kokkinotrimithia and partly within the UN Buffer Zone.

References

Communities in Nicosia District